In the inaugural edition of the tournament, Magdalena Maleeva and Patty Schnyder won the title by defeating Nathalie Dechy and Meilen Tu 6–3, 6–7(3–7), 6–3 in the final.

Seeds

Draw

Draw

References
 Official results archive (ITF)
 Official results archive (WTA)

2002 Doubles
Proximus Diamond Games
Proximus Diamond Games
Diamond Games